The Black Box International Theatre and Dance Festival has taken place every spring in Plovdiv, Bulgaria since 2007. It lasts for one week and is centered on theater and contemporary dance.

The first edition of the festival in 2007 was hosted in the Hindliyan House-Museum in the Old town of Plovdiv. The event was supported by the Plovdiv Municipality, the Cultural Institute "Old Plovdiv" and the Ministry of Culture of Bulgaria. The focus of the first edition was to give the floor to female performers only.

The festival's ninth edition in 2015, with its 600 applications for participation, is reportedly the first major cultural event which takes place after the official designation of Plovdiv as European Capital of Culture for the year 2019. The festival is considered to be "one of the most valuable international events for theater and contemporary dance" that take place in Bulgaria. Partners in the organization of the Black Box Festival'2014 are the Ministry of Culture, Plovdiv Municipality, the Embassies of Austria, Belgium, Israel and United States, The Italian Culture Institute, The Polish Institute, The Hungarian Cultural Institute, Plovdiv Culture House "Boris Hristov", Plovdiv Drama Theatre, Municipal Institute "Old Plovdiv" and Trakart Culture Centre. In 2015, the history of the festival is shown with a photo gallery that is publicly installed in the central pedestrian zone of Plovdiv.

History 
2017 - 11th festival
 Opening: Joséphina, by Sandrine Heyraud and Sicaire Durieux, ChaliWate Company, Belgium
 Contemporary Dance Program:
 iShade, by the Jade Dance Theatre, Taiwan
 Before Sunrise, by Hsiao-Wei Hsieh & Hsiao-Ting Hsieh, InTW Studio, Тaiwan
 360º, iMEE Dance Company, USA
 Suites, by Tomas Danielis, Austria
 Program Plovdiv in Focus:
 _WръZки_, by Yanitsa Atanasova
 I, the Lie, by the Pantarey Dance Studio
 ... point. Point of view, by the Duende Dance Studio
 Smoke like a man, solo Performance by Yafit Levi, Israel
 Queen of Spades, State Puppet Theatre, Plovdiv, Bulgaria
 Helicopter, a documentary film about Kolio Karamfilov, directed by Krum Philipov
 Blue eyes black hair, by Irena Ivanova, based on works by Marguerite Duras and Vladislav Hristov
 Couchettes by Alain Giroud, performed by Fractorium Dei Movement Theater, Bulgaria
 Contemporary Ballet Master Class with iMEE Dance Company, USA
 Contemporary Dance and Bulgarian Folklore workshop with Rara Avis Dance Company, Bulgaria
 Closing: Evening Shadow, by Alessandro Serra, performed by Chiara Michelini, Teatropersona Company, Italy

2016 - 10th festival
 Opening: Apartheid, by Étienne Béchard, Opinion Public Company, Belgium
 Contemporary Dance Program:
 De-parts by Miriam Engel
 No Hands by Miriam Engel
 love-joy diver, by Megan Mazarick and Les Rivera, USA
 Bitter-Sweet, performed by Gustavo Hoyos and Jerome Leperlier, Umami Theatre & Dance Project, Spain
 Blood Wedding, solo performance by Maria Vidal, Abrego Theatre, Spain
 6 rooms, a joint dance project by Boriana Tengulova, Maya Pavlova, Maria Ivanova, Elena Zdravkova and Ivaylo Ivanov, Denitsa Gergenikova and Dragomir Yordanov, Bulgaria
 Crazy Glue, inspired by Etgar Keret, Single Shoe Productions, United Kingdom
 The Samsas, inspired by Franz Kafka, directed by Katya Petrova, Theatre Laboratory Sfumato, Bulgaria
 Master class with Tomas Danielis, Austria
 Closing: Expanding Foam, by Gabriella Catalano & Paolo Rosini, Bambula Project,  United Kingdom/Italy

2015 - 9th festival
 Opening: How I Managed Not to Flatten My Husband, choreographed by Anne Lopez, Les Gens du quai Company, Montpellier, France
 Earth and Tales in Black and White by Andrea Hackl, Austria
 OOups by Jordi L. Vidal Company, Belgium
 World Wide Violin by Frédéric Tari, France
 Birds Never Sleep, PTAH Theatre, Hungary
 Why I Killed My Mother by Dor Zweigenbom, Israel
 contemporary dance program:
 Ivonice, Untitled & The secret of life is to fall seven times & get up eight, works by Andrea Dawn Shelley and Spencer Gavin Hering, iMEE Dance Company, United States of America
 The Perfect World, solo by Bartech Woszczynski, Poland
 Morgan & Freeman by Ferenc Fehér, Hungary
 Slipstream by Mihaela Griveva, Bulgaria/Ireland
 Program “Plovdiv in Focus”:
 So Close, Duende Dance Studio, Bulgaria
 Apathy by Denitsa Gerginkova, Pantarey Studio, Bulgaria
 Loneliness by Boryana Tеngulova, Bulgaria
 Escurial, Theatre Hand, Bulgaria
 Naveneva, Naturalis Labor Company, Italy
 Closing: Other Side by Dejan Dukovski, choreographed and directed by Fenia Apostolou, Lydia Lithos Dance Theatre, Greece

2014 - 8th festival
 Opening: Bob’Art by Étienne Béchard, Opinion Public Company, Belgium
 The Woman Who Didn’t Want to Come Down to Earth – a trilogy by Gabrielle Neuhaus, Israel
 Brecht by Toma Markov, Bulgaria
 contemporary dance program:
 Alma, duet by Rachel Erdos
 Prism solo by Andrea Hackl, Netherlands
 Exit solo by Olga Kosterina, Russia
 from the festival “euro-scene” in Leipzig:
 Bim bam bum, performed by Justyna Kalbarczyk, choreographed by Bridie Gane
 Dark Quark by Irina Demina, Hamburg, Germany
 Immured by Veselka Kuncheva, Contrast Films LTD and State Puppet Theatre, Plovdiv, Bulgaria
 PASS/AGES by Elena R. Marino, Teatrincorso, Italy
 Monologue for Two, Duende Dance Studio, Bulgaria
 Weathered/Layers, Erica Essner Performance Co-Op, New York
 Closing: Duel, choreographed by Anne Lopez, Les Gens du quai Company, Montpellier, France

2013 - 7th festival
 Opening: Two of Us, directed and performed by Ana Pepine and Paul Cimpoieru, Passe-Partout D.P. Theatre Company, Romania
 Program “Contemporary dance and performance”:
 Mi arma solo by Laila Tafur, Spain
 Adi el-Rabi, duet dance by Orly Portal and Shlomit Yossef, Israel
 Plant B by Ilona Roth, performed by Anna Majder and Marina Mazaraki, Transitheart Productions, Germany
 Play.Back.Again.Then. by Ji-Eun Lee, United Kingdom/Korea
 Souvenir, solo by Julia Danzinger, Austria
 About Me and a Bit about You, solo by Liwia Bargieł, Poland
 Second Hand Landscapes by Cristina Goletti and Nick Bryson, Legitimate Bodies Dance Company, Ireland
 Zona de arribo, solo by Nidia Barbieri, Argentina/Italy
 Svarta Rosor, individuo by Mieke Segers and Yentl de Werdt, Sacred Places, Belgium
 Program “Plovdiv in Focus”:
 Ego by Ivo Ignatov-Kenny, Theatre Hand, Bulgaria
 Glass by Elena Aleksieva, directed by Kalin Angelov, performed by Ivana Papazova
 The Road/Trail, Duende Dance Studio, Bulgaria
 Closing: Gagarin’s Daughters, Mobil Teatr Lab, Hungary

2012 - 6th festival
 Opening: Dilemma, solo performance by Olga Kosterina, Moscow, Russia
 Wild Green by Dimitar Atanasov, directed by Nikolay Georgiev, Alma Alter Theatre-Laboratory, Bulgaria
 Prophecy, based on texts by Peter Handke and Vesselin Dimov, directed by Vesselin Dimov, MOMO Theatre Company, Sofia, Bulgaria
 Penthesilea (Pathologie), video performance by Evy Schubert, Berlin, Germany
 Mo(ve)ment by Tali Farchi, painting, and Benno Hübner, dance, Israel/Holland Art Collective
 Misery by Iván Rojas, Atomic Theatre Company, Spain/Chile
 Contemporary dance program “Body and Rhythm”:
 Calypso by Noa Shadur, Tel Aviv, Israel
 Juanita Hildegard Bo, solo performance by Galina Borissova, Sofia, Bulgaria
 Tessitura, solo performance by Lucille Teppa, London, England
 Bluebird, solo performance by Rosa Mei, 13 Dance Troupe, Belgium
 Nothing for Body, solo performance by Howool Baek, Germany/Korea

2011 - 5th festival
 Opening: Odysseus Chaoticus by Masha Nemirovsky, Ish Theatre, Israel
 Birth Mark by Mimoza Bazova, Sfumato Laboratory Theatre, Bulgaria
 The Woman I Could Have Been, written and performed by Inbal Lori, directed by Shmulik Levi, Israel
 The Heart Made a Mess by Juan Luis Mira, Diáfano Theatre Company, Spain
 Nevena and the Night by Georgi Toshev, Bulgaria
 The Stone Guest by Alexander Pushkin, directed by Olesya Nevmerzhitskaya, A. N. Ostrovsky Theatre, Russia

2010 - 4th festival
 Opening: Bleeding, written and directed by Yaron Kerbel, The Room Theatre, Israel
 The Impossible You, The Impossible Me by Nikolay Georgiev, @lma @lter Theatre-Laboratory, Bulgaria
 Oedipus: The Celebration of the Blinding by Ruslan Kudasov, coproduction by the Plovdiv, Stara Zagora and Burgas Puppet Theatres, Bulgaria
 The Overcoat by Nikolai Gogol, directed by Ivan Kovachev, Zig Zag Theatre Company, Bulgaria
 Scenes of Family Life, based on three novels by Anton Chekhov, directed by Olga Vasilieva, Ostrovsky Drama Theatre, Moscow, Russia
 The Suitcase Play by Federico Nieto – El’ Gazi, directed by Margarita Amarantidi, βλακlist International Theatre Group, Greece – Colombia
 The Girl With the Nine Wigs, based on the autobiography of Sophie van der Stap, directed by Mina Salehpour, Schauspiel Frankfurt, Germany

2009 - 3rd festival Velyo Goranov, special guest
 Words of Silence by Laurent Decol, France
 The Line by Tarick Markovich, Bosnia-Herzegovina
 Mira Mirrors by Nilson Muniz, Brazil
 The Smile by Mania Papadimitriou, Greece
 Pilgrim by Elian Valaji, Israel

2008 - 2nd festival
 Lazaritsa by Yordan Radichkov, directed by Krikor Azaryan, Tear and Laughter Theatre, Bulgaria
 I’m Not Dreyfus, written and directed by Yehoshua Sobol, Chamber Theatre, Tel Aviv, Israel
 Futurological Congress by Stanisław Lem, directed by Marcel Luxinger, Schauspiel Frankfurt, Germany
 The Diary of a Madman by Nikolai Gogol, directed by Takis Zamaryas, Onstage Art Theatre, Athens, Greece
 Hooligan’s Confession by Sergei Yesenin, directed by Valeriy Taganski, Taganka Theatre, Moscow, Russia
 M. Ibrahim and the Flowers of the Koran by Éric-Emmanuel Schmitt, directed by Snezhina Tankovska, Ivan Vazov National Theatre, Sofia, Bulgaria

2007 - 1st festival: The curator is the Bulgarian director Krikor Azaryan
 Oscar and the Lady in Pink by Éric-Emmanuel Schmitt, directed by Yordan Slaveykov, Vratza Drama Theatre, Bulgaria
 Nothing More Beautiful by Oliver Bukovski, directed by Mladen Alexiev, Nikolay Binev Youth Theatre, Sofia, Bulgaria
 Martin, Dancho and Their Mother, written and directed by Kamen Donev, Ivan Vazov National Theatre, Sofia, Bulgaria
 Partly It’s About Love, Partly It’s About Killing by Fiona Sprott, directed by Stilyan Petrov, Ivan Vazov National Theatre, Sofia, Bulgaria
 Obsessed by Koraksia Kortez, directed by Marcel Luxinger, Schauspiel Frankfurt, Germany

References

External links
 official website
 The dancer Mihaela Griveva about her work and about the festival
 About the "Other side" show at the festival
 http://institutpolski.org/?tribe_events=mezhdunaroden-festival-za-teatar-i-savremenen-tants-chernata-kutiya&lang=pl
 https://web.archive.org/web/20160303200646/http://institutpolski.org/?tribe_events=ix-%D0%BC%D0%B5%D0%B6%D0%B4%D1%83%D0%BD%D0%B0%D1%80%D0%BE%D0%B4%D0%B5%D0%BD-%D1%84%D0%B5%D1%81%D1%82%D0%B8%D0%B2%D0%B0%D0%BB-%D0%B7%D0%B0-%D1%82%D0%B5%D0%B0%D1%82%D1%8A%D1%80-%D0%B8-%D1%81%D1%8A%D0%B2&lang=pl
 https://web.archive.org/web/20160303203627/http://www.iicsofia.esteri.it/IIC_Sofia/webform/SchedaEvento.aspx?id=455
 http://kultura.bg/web/истината-за-човека/
 https://web.archive.org/web/20160303172101/https://web.archive.org/web/20160303172101/http://timeart.me/bg/stcena/festivali/Festivalyt-Chernata-kutiJa-2015-nablijava_14459
 http://timeart.me/bg/stcena/festivali/Festivalyt-Chernata-kutiJa-2015-nablijava_14459
 https://web.archive.org/web/20160303191741/http://www.artualno.info/teatar-savremenen-tants-i-kontserti-na-devetiya-mezhdunaroden-festival-chernata-kutiya
 http://bgdancer.info/2015/05/22/девети-фестивал-за-театър-и-съвремене/
 http://podtepeto.com/art/chernata-kutiya-festivalt-na-tvorcheskiya-duh-i-talant/
 http://pik.bg/започва-фестивалът-черната-кутия-в-пловдив-news341071.html
 https://web.archive.org/web/20160303213632/http://plovdiv.topnovini.bg/node/609540
 http://www.dariknews.bg/view_article.php?article_id=1444475
 https://web.archive.org/web/20160303170428/http://bnt.bg/part-of-show/mezhdunaroden-festival-za-teata-r-i-sa-vremenen-tants-chernata-kutiya-v-plovdiv
 http://mediacafe.bg/novini/kultura-i-izkustvo/Chernata-kutija-promenja-oblika-na-Plovdiv-pred-Evropa-VIDEO-8688
 https://web.archive.org/web/20150730071012/http://news.bgnes.com/view/1236297
 https://web.archive.org/web/20160303185704/http://bnt.bg/bnt2-regionalni/bnt2-plovdiv/zapochva-festivala-t-chernata-kutiya
 http://mediacafe.bg/novini/kultura-i-izkustvo/Teatralnijat-tantsov-festival-Chernata-kutija-za-9-ti-pyt-v-Plovdiv-8570
 https://web.archive.org/web/20150927233420/http://www.trud.bg/Article.asp?ArticleId=4795891
 http://www.marica.bg/пълен-салон-за-отварянето-на-деветата-черна-кутия-news419328.html
 https://web.archive.org/web/20160303191803/http://bnt.bg/predavanyia/bulgaria-dnes/ba-lgariya-dnes-izla-chvane-ot-plovdiv-4-yuni-2015
 http://mediacafe.bg/novini/savremeno-izkustvo/Ludo-akrobatichno-shou-otkri-Chernata-kutija-v-tsentyra-na-Plovdiv-VIDEO-i-SNIMKI--8696
 http://kapana.bg/index.php/ulitza/item/2561-internatzionalniyat-ezik-na-chernata-kutiya
 http://mediacafe.bg/novini/muzika/Frenskite-aktyori-ot-Blackbox-Plovdivskata-publika-e-strakhotna-SNIMKI-8708
 https://web.archive.org/web/20160303183057/http://bnt.bg/predavanyia/bulgaria-dnes/izla-chvane-ot-plovdiv-28-05-2015-2
 http://mediacafe.bg/novini/kino/Chernata-kutija--Koj-e-po-goljam-nie-ili-nasheto-ego-SNIMKI-8736
 http://mediacafe.bg/novini/kino/Dor-TSvajgenbom-Syrtseto-mi-ostava-v-Plovdiv-VIDEO-8739
 http://europlovdiv.com/izraelskiyat-teatr-otnovo-ocharova-ot-scenata-na-chernata-kutiya/
 http://www.marica.bg/андрея-дшели-опитвам-се-да-събудя-вълнението-тревогата-в-публиката-news422336.html
 http://mediacafe.bg/novini/kino/Plovdiv-e-moeto-italiansko-frape-Video-8750
 http://mediacafe.bg/novini/savremeno-izkustvo/Porazhenijata-v-sledvoenna-JUgoslavija-zakrikha-Chernata-kutija-v-Plovdiv-8754

Festivals in Bulgaria
Culture in Plovdiv
Tourist attractions in Plovdiv
Annual events in Bulgaria
Spring (season) events in Bulgaria